Juliette Gruber (born 1965) is a British actress born in the United States, but who moved to Britain at the age of one.

Gruber is the niece of Hollywood actor Walter Matthau (1920–2000), who was married to her mother's sister. Gruber is the daughter of Walter Gruber, Newsweek Magazine journalist, and Elinor Pruder, the renowned interior designer. Gruber's sister, Caroline, is ballet mistress at the Royal Winnipeg Ballet school.

Gruber studied at Trinity College and, after graduating, got a job at the Royal National Theatre.

TV roles followed, with appearances in the British drama Soldier, Soldier in 1991, police drama Between the Lines (1992–1994) and, in 1995, a role in Kavanagh QC.

Gruber played Thomasina Coverly in one performance during the premiere run of Tom Stoppard's Arcadia in 1993 at the Lyttelton Theatre, stepping in for Emma Fielding.

From 1995, Gruber played schoolteacher Jo Weston in the ITV series Heartbeat, where she became a series regular. Gruber appeared in several seasons.

In 1997, Gruber decided to leave Heartbeat and her character moved to Canada with her screen husband, played by Nick Berry.  Her character Jo drove an Austin-Healey Sprite (881 BCR) for the duration of her appearances. Gruber became close friends with her co-star, Berry.

When Gruber left the series she settled in southern France with her then boyfriend, a musician.

Gruber eventually returned to the UK and, in 2001, she began training in yoga; she trained with various masters in India, America and Greece. Gruber then became a yoga instructor herself, teaching in London and, later, in Hertfordshire. Gruber, now using her married name, is a yoga instructor in the Cotswolds.

Gruber, again under her married name, has directed plays in the Cotswolds.

Gruber is married to an antiques dealer, Charles, with whom she has two children, twins.

References

British actresses
Living people
1965 births